The 2016–17 La Salle Explorers basketball team represented La Salle University during the 2016–17 NCAA Division I men's basketball season. The Explorers, led by 13th-year head coach John Giannini, played their home games at Tom Gola Arena in Philadelphia, Pennsylvania as members of the Atlantic 10 Conference. They finished the season 15–15, 9–9 in A-10 play to finish in a tie for seventh place. As the No. 8 seed in the A-10 tournament, they lost to Davidson in the first round.

Previous season 
The Explorers finished the 2015–16 season 9–22, 4–14 in A-10 play to finish in last place. They defeated Duquesne in the first round of the A-10 tournament to advance to the second round where they lost to Davidson.

Offseason

Departures

2016 recruiting class

Preseason 
La Salle was picked to finish in seventh place in the Preseason A-10 poll. Jordan Price was named to the Preseason All-Conference Second Team.

Roster

Schedule and results

|-
!colspan=9 style=| Exhibition

|-
!colspan=9 style=| Regular season

|-
!colspan=9 style=|Atlantic 10 tournament

References

La Salle Explorers men's basketball seasons
La Salle
La Salle
La Salle